Kia Tigers are a South Korean professional baseball team founded in 1982 and based in the southwestern city of Gwangju. Until 2001, they were known as the Haitai Tigers. The Tigers are a members of the KBO League and are the most successful team in Korean baseball, having won the national Korean Series championship 11 times with a perfect 11–0 record. Their home stadium is Gwangju-Kia Champions Field in Gwangju.

After the success of the 1980s and 1990s, the fortunes of the team began to turn, resulting in them finishing bottom of the league for the first time in 2005, and again in 2007. In 2009, however, Kia Tigers won the 2009 KBO season and 2009 Korean Series.

History

Haitai Tigers was the third professional baseball team to be created in South Korea, after the OB Bears and MBC Chungyong. They were founded on January 30, 1982, with 14 players. Kim Dong-yeob, the first manager of the team, was fired after just one month, and Jo Chang-soo took over his position and led the team to a record of 38–42. Due to the lack of position players, many players in the league both pitched and batted. Kim Seong-han, for instance, had a record of ten wins and led the league in RBIs with 69 the first year.

In 1983, Haitai hired Kim Eung-ryong as manager, who had studied baseball in the United States (and had managed Haitai's amateur baseball team from 1964 to 1981). He eventually led the team to its first championship in 1983. The Tigers won the Korean Series 4–0–1 against MBC Chungyong. Although the team did not make it to the playoffs for the next two years, it set the foundation for the golden years to come by signing in future stars Lee Soon-cheol, Sun Dong-yeol, and Kim Seong-han.

Bang Soo-won pitched the first no-hitter in Korean baseball history in 1984 against the Sammi Superstars.

Under manager Kim Eung-ryong in the years 1983 to 1997, the Tigers won nine championships, never losing a Korean Series during that span. In 1986, the Tigers finished in second place in the pennant race with a team ERA of 2.86 and a batting average of .272, to go straight to the Korean Series against the Samsung Lions. They went on to win their second Korean Series 4–1.

Until 1989, the Haitai Tigers won once more against the Samsung Lions and twice against the Binggrae Eagles to complete four consecutive Korean Series wins. Kim Jung-soo, Kim Joon-hwan, Moon Hye-soo, and Park Chul-woo respectively were named MVPs of each series.

The Tigers lost in the playoffs to the Samsung Lions in 1990, but won the next Korean Series the following year. In 1991, the Tigers set a record when the team won six out of ten possible KBO League Golden Glove Awards.

1993 was the year of rookie shortstop Lee Jong-beom, closer Sun Dong-yeol, and starters Lee Dae-jin and Lee Kang-chul. The Tigers won 81 out of 126 games and also their seventh Korean Series, defeating the Samsung Lions.

In 1994, Lee Jong-beom batted an average of 0.393, the second-highest in Korean baseball history, but the team lost the semi-playoffs to the Hanhwa Eagles. The Tigers ended up in fourth the next year due to Lee Jong-beom and Lee Dae-jin leaving the team for military service, which is mandatory for all male South Korean citizens over 18.

Star closer Sun Dong-yeol was also transferred to the Chunichi Dragons in 1996, but Lim Chang-yong and Gang Tae-won filled in his position to lead the team to its eighth Korean Series win over the Hyundai Unicorns.

The next year, Lee Jong-beom and Lee Dae-jin returned from military service and with their help the Tigers again won the Korean Series, defeating the LG Twins, to bring the total to nine champion wins.

Due to the Asian financial crisis in 1998, Haitai was forced to sell the team to Kia in 2001. Until then the Tigers were also in financial difficulty, could not convince their major players to stay. Eventually, they lost Lee Jong-beom to the Chunichi Dragons, and closer Lim Chang-yong and manager Kim Eung-ryong to the Samsung Lions.

Lee Jong-beom returned from Japan, and rookies Hong Se-wan, catcher Kim Sang-hoon and pitcher Kim Jin-woo joined between 2001 and 2002 to lead the team to the playoffs for three straight years from 2002 to 2004. But each time they were beaten, by the LG Twins, the SK Wyverns, and the Doosan Bears respectively.

Kia Tigers lost 76 games to end up in eighth place in 2005. Manager Yoo Nam-ho was fired and Seo Jung-hwan took charge, but again ended up in last place in 2007 despite his effort and joining of former MLB player Hee-seop Choi.

Batting coach Jo Beom-hyun was promoted to the new manager position in June 2007. Former MLB pitcher Seo Jae-weong joined the team the next year in 2008, but because of a weak lineup, unstable defense and bullpen problems, the Tigers finished the pennant race in sixth place.

The 2009 season featured a rough start for the Tigers, and it looked as if the strong starting rotation of Rick Guttormson, Aquilino López, Yoon Suk-min, and Yang Hyeon-jong would get little support from the team's offense. But with Lee Jong-beom's leadership, Choi Hee-seop's revival from his three-year-long slump, and Kim Sang-hyeon's hitting, the Tigers won the pennant with the second-lowest team ERA in the league (3.92) and a win percentage of 0.609.

The Tigers won the 2009 KBO season and 2009 Korean Series, which was the first "double- victory" (having the best record in the regular season and then winning the Korea Series) by a team in the KBO since 1997. Twenty-four-year-old Outfielder Na Ji-Wan was named the series MVP after hitting a walk-off home run in the bottom of the ninth inning in Game Seven of the series.

On October 18, 2011, Sun Dong-yeol and Lee Soon-cheol returned to the Tigers. Sun Dong-yeol was named the new manager and Lee Sun-choel was named the new head coach of the KIA Tigers.

In Sun's first season, the Tigers finished a disappointing fifth place after making the playoffs in 2012. Struggling for most of the year, a late playoff surge saw the Tigers fall just short of their rivals, the Lotte Giants, who claimed the fourth and final postseason position. The final weeks, however, inspired a lot of confidence that 2013 would be a good year after starting pitchers Seo Jae-weong, Kim Jin-woo and Yoon Suk-min all posted complete-game wins.

Sun Dong-yeol was retained as manager of the Tigers and after a very promising pre-season, the Tigers were considered one of the favorites for the Korean Series. Their early season form was blistering and, by early May, they sat top of the table. The batters, especially Choi Hee-seop, came alive and left-handed pitcher Yang Hyeon-jong was enjoying his best run since notching up 16 wins in 2010.

But the Tigers made a disastrous trade when they off-loaded 2009 MVP Kim Sang-hyeon to the SK Wyverns for right-handed pitcher Song Eun-beom. Song had previously pitched in the Korean Series against the Samsung Lions but his form plummeted and KIA went on to rue the missing power from Kim once Choi, and others, faded horribly as the season progressed. They were effectively out of the playoff hunt with over a month to go, ending the 2013 season with just 51 wins from their 128 games in eighth place out of nine teams, ahead of the Hanwha Eagles.

In 2014, the Tigers moved to their new home, the 27,000 capacity Gwangju KIA Champions Field. Sun Dong-yeol was given his third season with the club, but Lee Sun-cheol moved on. Free agents Lee Yong-kyu (Hanwha Eagles) and Yoon Suk-min (Baltimore) left the club but the Tigers brought in LG Twins' center-fielder Lee Dae-hyung as a free agent. Lee, born in Gwangju, was joined at his home town club by Kim Byung-hyun, a two-time World Series champion. Their three foreign players were starting pitcher D.J. Houlton, closer Jairo Asencio and first baseman Brett Pill. Houlton was replaced midway through the season by Justin Thomas.

Despite posting some solid batting numbers, the Tigers finished eighth in the standings, one place above the Hanwha Eagles, with a .422 winning percentage from their 128 games (54 wins, 74 losses). The team had the second-worst ERA in the League (5.52), and the joint most number of blown saves (21). Yang Hyeon-jong finished 2014 with 16 wins, his best figures since 2010. First baseman Pill hit 19 home runs for the season, the same number as Na Ji-wan and Lee Beom-ho. Infielder An Chi-hong struck a career-best 18 home runs and a .339 batting average.

The Tigers controversially re-signed manager Sun to a new two-year deal with an annual salary of 380 million won (US$359,500) and a 300 million won signing bonus just days after the regular season ended. Irate fans swamped the club's website demanding the 51-year-old tear up his new contract. Six days later, on October 25, Sun announced that he was stepping down as Tigers manager.

On October 28, 2014, the club announced that Kim Ki-tae, born in Gwangju, would be their new manager, having signed a three-year deal. In 2013, Kim led the LG Twins to their first post-season in eleven years, but quit just a month into the new season. As a player, Kim led the League in home runs (1994) and won the batting title in 1997. After retiring, Kim was voted the league's best-ever designated hitter.

In 2017, the club, as the regular-season champions, automatically advanced to the 2017 Korean Series. They played the winner of the playoff series, the Doosan Bears, who defeated the NC Dinos in the playoff. Kia won the best-of-seven series, 4–1. Yang Hyeon-jong was named the series' most valuable player.

Shortly after the 2019 season, the Tigers named former San Francisco Giants star Matt Williams as their first American manager.

Season-by-season records

Team

Current lineup

Managers
Kim Dong-yeob (1982)
Cho Chang-soo (1982) (caretaker)
Kim Eung-ryong (1983–2000)
Kim Seong-han (2000–2004)
Yoo Nam-ho (2004–2005)
Seo Jeong-hwan (2005–2007)
Cho Beom-hyeon (2007–2011)
Sun Dong-yol (2011–2014)
Kim Ki-tai (2014–2019)
Park Heung-sik (2019) (caretaker)
Matt Williams (2020–2021)
Kim Jong-kook (2022–present)

Retired numbers

References
General

Specific

External links

 Official website 
  

 
KBO League teams
Sport in Gwangju
Tigers
Baseball teams established in 1982
1982 establishments in South Korea